Pseudocrenilabrus nicholsi is a species of cichlid native to the Congo Basin in Africa. As other members of the genus Pseudocrenilabrus, it is a mouthbrooder.  This species can reach a length of  SL. The specific name honours the American ichthyologist John Treadwell Nichols (1883–1958) who was curator of fishes at the American Museum of Natural History. Nichols originally described this species as Paratilapia ventralis in 1928 but this name had already been used by George Albert Boulenger for another species of cichlid in 1898.

References

 : Pseudocrenilabrus nicholsi.

nicholsi
Fish of Africa
Taxa named by Jacques Pellegrin
Fish described in 1928
Endemic fauna of the Democratic Republic of the Congo